Arkansas State University-Beebe (Beebe State) is a public community college in Arkansas.

Campuses 

Arkansas State University-Beebe
Arkansas State University-Beebe Searcy Campus
Arkansas State University-Beebe Heber Springs Campus
Arkansas State University-Beebe at Little Rock Air Force Base in Jacksonville
Arkansas State University-Beebe Online Campus

Academics

Admission 
For fall 2017 ASU-Beebe reported having 1,867 full-time students and 1,872 part-time students, for a total of 3,739 students, 59% of whom were female and 41% were male. The student body was predominantly white 80%, with 6% reporting as Hispanic/Latino, 6% as Black or African-American, and 1% as Asian.

Teaching and learning 
ASU-Beebe offers degrees and certificates such as associate degrees, technical certificates, and certificates of proficiency. The associate degree programs last for two years for full-time students.  Programs include liberal arts and sciences, general studies and humanities, health professions, and business, management, and marketing.

ASU-Beebe has an open enrollment policy and for the 2017–2018 school year in-state tuition was $3,570 and out-of-state $5,730. The  student-faculty ratio is 17-to-1 and total enrollment as of 2019 is 3,739.

Campuses for ASU-Beebe are located in Beebe, Heber Springs, Searcy, and the Little Rock Air Force Base and the university also offers online courses.

ASU-Beebe offers 2+2 programs in affiliated with other colleges and universities to work towards a bachelor's degree, such as the University of Central Arkansas.  Students will be assigned to an academic advisor who will work with them with their goals and the 1+2 program agreements, so they will only take classes that are transferable and will work towards their chosen degree. Based on a 2014 cohort of students transferring out of ASU-Beebe in 2017, the university has a transfer rate of 13%. The university also has a partnership with Arkansas State University of Jonesboro to offer baccalaureate and graduate degrees on the Beebe campus.

References

External links 
Official website

Buildings and structures in Beebe, Arkansas
Educational institutions established in 1927
Beebe
Education in White County, Arkansas
1927 establishments in Arkansas
Public universities and colleges in Arkansas